Dagslett  is a village in Asker municipality in Viken county, Norway. Located just south of Spikkestad  in the west of the municipality,  it is a part of the Drammen  urban area  which stretches into Røyken. The part of the Drammen urban area that stretches into Røyken has a population of 3,114.

References

Villages in Viken (county)
Villages in Buskerud
Villages in Asker
Villages in Røyken
Røyken